The Windermere Hills are a mountain range in Elko County, Nevada, located northeast of Wells, Nevada. In 1967, when the name was approved, the Windermere Hills were described as being bounded by the Thousand Springs Creek to the north, the Southern Pacific line to the south, the Union Pacific line to the west and an unnamed valley to the east.  The hills are named for Windermere, a small town in England.

References 

Mountain ranges of Nevada
Mountain ranges of the Great Basin
Mountain ranges of Elko County, Nevada